Ákos Kovács (born in Budapest, 6 April 1968) is a Hungarian pop-rock singer-songwriter. He is known for his solo career writing and performing serious, poetic pop songs, as well as a member of the now defunct group Bonanza Banzai. Kovács uses his given name, Ákos, in his career. His name is written Akosh, to reflect the Hungarian pronunciation, when his music is distributed to English-speaking countries. His songs are on the top lists of Hungarian music.

Personal life
Kovács grew up in a family of lawyers. A member of the Pier Paolo Pasolini film club, he aspired to be a film director, but his mother strictly forbade this. As a compromise, he attended the Corvinus University of Budapest and graduated in 1992 with a degree in foreign trade.

In addition to Hungarian, he speaks English and Italian. He is politically conservative. He is married to Krisztina Őry, and they have four children: Kata, Marci, Anna and Julia.

Career

Kovács has been involved in many musical projects. He was a member of the Hungarian band Bonanza Banzai, which split in 1995. In 1999, he translated Phil Collins's songs for the Disney film Tarzan into Hungarian. 
In addition to music, Kovács also writes poetry.

He is the first Hungarian musician to have prepared a Blu-ray publication, namely the video and audio footage recorded during the 29 stations of the 40+ tour. The high quality of this publication is characterized by the fact that even the extras will be presented in high-definition. It is expected to be released in November 2009. After the release, he will take a few months break and will focus on the new songs for his upcoming album.

Discography
1993 - Karcolatok
1993 - So Much Larger
1994 - Test
1994 - All is One
1995 - Indiántánc
1996 - Élő dalok
1996 - Firedance
1997 - Beavatás
1997 - ÚjRaMIX
1998 - I.D.S.
1998 - Ikon
1999 - Ismerj fel
1999 - Call My Name
2000 - Hűség
2001 - A hét parancsszó
2002 - Vertigo
2002 - Új törvény
2003 - Andante
2004 - Az utolsó hangos dal
2005 - X+I + Andante Extra
2006 - Még közelebb
2008 - Kaland a régi királlyal
2009 - 40+
2010 - A katona imája
2011 - Arénakoncert 2011
2012 - 2084

With Bonanza Banzai:
1989 - Induljon a banzáj!
1990 - A jel
1990 - The Compilation
1991 - 1984
1991 - A pillanat emlékműve
1991 - Monumentum
1992 - Bonanza Live Banzai
1992 - Elmondatott
1993 - Régi és új
1994 - Jóslat
1995 - Búcsúkoncert

Video albums:
1992 - Bonanza Live Banzai (VHS)
1994 - Bonanza Banzai Ünnep '93 (VHS)
1995 - Ákos a Budapest Sportcsarnokban (VHS)
1998 - Beavatás-koncertfilm (VHS)
1999 - Ismerj Fel (VHS)
2001 - Hűség (VHS and DVD)
2003 - Andante (VHS and DVD)
2004 - Az Utolsó Hangos Dal (VHS and double DVD)
2005 - Az Utolsó Hangos Dal - RÁADÁS (triple DVDs)
2007 – Még Közelebb – Koncertfilm (3 DVDs)
2008 - Bonanza Banzai - '87-'92 (DVD)
2009 - Bonanza Banzai - '94-'95 (DVD)
2009 - 40+ - Koncertfilm (DVD and Blu-ray Disc)
2010 - Szindbád Turné (DVD)
2011 - Arénakoncert 2011 (double DVD and Blu-ray Disc)

Poetry volumes:
1991 - Dúdolnom kell
1993 - Napló feletteseimnek
1995 - Szavak és csendek
1998 - Szív, seb, ész
2000 - A hűség könyve

See also
 Hungarian pop

References

External links
Official site

Hungarian pop singers
1968 births
20th-century Hungarian male singers
English-language singers from Hungary
21st-century Hungarian male singers
Living people
Corvinus University of Budapest alumni
MTV Europe Music Award winners